The Irish Games Association (IGA) is a non-profit body which promotes gaming in Ireland. It runs, supports, and publicises gaming events, while "seeking to communicate and cooperate with others that do likewise".

The IGA engages in a number of activities designed to "further its stated aim of promoting gaming in Ireland", and has evolved over its lifespan.

Events
Originally, the IGA was a group composed of different gaming interests from around the country who came together to organise an event known as Gaelcon. The first Gaelcon was run in 1989 in the Royal Dublin Society.  It has been run annually since then, growing to become Ireland's largest independent (i.e., non-college) games convention. Subsequent venues included Croke Park's convention centre and Royal Hospital Kilmainham. While the main focus of the convention is on role-playing games, war games and collectible card games (such as Dungeons & Dragons, Warhammer 40,000 and Magic: The Gathering, respectively) and other games, other aspects include events such as the annual charity auction, which has raised in excess of €250,000 since its inception at Gaelcon 1996.

In 2006, the international Diana Jones Award was awarded to 'Irish Game Convention Charity Auctions', including Gaelcon and Warpcon.

Activities
In general, the IGA seeks to help the gaming community by organising events, providing information, publicising events or offering what assistance it can to others who are "working on behalf of the gaming community in Ireland".  This has included the provision of financial assistance to new conventions and gaming societies.

The IGA is not, nor does it claim to be, a representative body for gaming in Ireland.

As of 2018, the IGA's activities and services included organising and running:
 the Gaelcon games convention, held annually on the October bank holiday weekend;
 the Academy of Eblana, a live action role-playing game with a fantasy setting, with events taking place over several weekends during the year;
 weekly games nights, held in Dublin and Cork.

References

External links 
 Irish Games Association website

Gaming conventions
Clubs and societies in the Republic of Ireland